Uvaria leichhardtii, commonly known as zig-zag vine, is a species of vine in the family Annonaceae. It is native to parts of Malesia, New Guinea, and the eastern Australian states of Queensland and New South Wales.

The orange fruit, which can be found year round on the vine, has a pleasant piquant orange-sherbet flavour, and is used for sauces in gourmet dishes.

Gallery

References

Annonaceae
Tropical fruit
Magnoliids of Australia
Bushfood
Flora of Queensland
Flora of New South Wales